"If Her Lovin' Don't Kill Me" is a song first recorded by American country music artist Aaron Tippin.  It was released in August 2002 as the second single from the album Stars & Stripes.  The song reached #40 on the Billboard Hot Country Singles & Tracks chart.  The song was written by John Rich, Vicky McGehee, and Tim Womack, then a member of Sons of the Desert.

John Anderson version

The song was recorded by American country music artist John Anderson and released in August 2006 as the first single from his album Easy Money. The song reached No. 59 on the Billboard Hot Country Songs chart.

Chart performance

Aaron Tippin

John Anderson

References

2002 songs
2002 singles
2006 singles
Aaron Tippin songs
John Anderson (musician) songs
Songs written by Vicky McGehee
Songs written by John Rich
Song recordings produced by John Rich
Lyric Street Records singles
Warner Records singles